Charles Elworthy may refer to:

 Charles Elworthy, Baron Elworthy (1911–1993), Chief of the Defence Staff
 Charles Elworthy (scientist) (born 1961), New Zealand economist and social scientist